Below is an outline of articles on genocide studies and closely related subjects; it is not an outline of acts or events related to genocide. The Event outlines section contains links to outlines of acts of genocide.

Subjects

 Acculturation
 Autogenocide
 Classicide
 Colonialism and genocide
 Command responsibility
 Crimes against humanity
 Crimes against humanity under communist regimes
 Cultural appropriation
 Cultural genocide
 Cumulative radicalization
 Death march
 Death squad
 Democide
 Discrimination
 Effects of genocide on youth
 Eliticide
 Ethnic cleansing
 Ethnic conflict
 Ethnic violence
 Ethnocide
 Eugenics
 Extermination camp
 Extermination through labour
 Forced assimilation
 Gendercide
 Genocidal massacre
 Genocidal rape
 Genocide definitions
 Genocide denial
 Genocide education
 Genocide justification
 Genocide of indigenous peoples
 Genocide prevention
 Genocide recognition politics
 Genocides in history
 Hate crime
 Hate crime laws in the United States
 Hate group
 Hate studies
 Hate speech
 Historical negationism
 Historical revisionism
 Holocaust studies
 Human rights
 Incitement to genocide
 International humanitarian law
 International law
 Law of war
 Mass killing
 Mass killings under communist regimes
 Nativism (politics)
 Oppression
 Perpetrator studies
 Perpetrators, victims, and bystanders, Rescuer (genocide)
 Persecution
 Pogrom
 Policide
 Political cleansing of population
 Politicide
 Population transfer
 Psychology of genocide
 Racism
 Religious violence
 Sectarian violence
 Supremacism
 Topocide
 Utilitarian genocide
 War and genocide
 War crime
 Wartime sexual violence
 Xenophobia

Events
Below are events which are related to Genocide studies, not acts of genocide or actions which are related to genocide.
 International Conference on the Holocaust and Genocide

Agreements
 Convention on the Prevention and Punishment of the Crime of Genocide
 United Nations General Assembly Resolution 96
 Rome Statute of the International Criminal Court
 List of parties to the Genocide Convention

Individuals
Below are individuals who have made notable contributions to the field of genocide studies.

 Taner Akçam
 Gary Bass
 Peter Balakian
 Yehuda Bauer
 Michael Berenbaum
 Max Bergholz
 Donald Bloxham
 Christopher Browning
 Iris Chang
 Israel W. Charny
 Vahakn Dadrian
 Lucy Dawidowicz
 Alison Des Forges
 Debórah Dwork
 Saul Friedländer
 Martin Gilbert
 Gregory Gordon (lawyer)
 Ted Gurr
 Barbara Harff 
 Raul Hilberg
 Alexander Laban Hinton
 Irving Louis Horowitz
 Adam Jones (Canadian scholar)
 Raymond Kévorkian
 Ben Kiernan
 Leo Kuper
 Raphael Lemkin
 Nora Levin
 Guenter Lewy
 Robert Melson (political scientist)
 Norman Naimark
 Jack Nusan Porter
 Samantha Power
 Rudolph Rummel
 Timothy D. Snyder
 David Stannard
 Gregory Stanton
 Uğur Ümit Üngör
 Benjamin Valentino
 James Waller
 Eric D. Weitz
 Stephen G. Wheatcroft
 Patrick Wolfe

Organisations
Below are organisations which are centered on the subject of genocide studies.
 International Association of Genocide Scholars
 International Network of Genocide Scholars

Books and publications
Books
 Blood and Soil 
 Extremely Violent Societies
 Final Solutions
 The Problems of Genocide
Journals
 Journal of Genocide Research
 Genocide Studies and Prevention
 Holocaust and Genocide Studies

Lists
 Genocides in history
 Genocides in history (before World War I)
 Genocides in history (World War I through World War II)
 Genocides in history (1946 to 1999)
 Genocides in history (21st century)
 Genocide of indigenous peoples
 List of ethnic cleansing campaigns
 List of genocides

Outlines of events
 
 Outline and timeline of the Greek genocide

See also
 Holocaust studies
 Crimes against humanity
 Hate crime
 War crime
 Bibliography of Genocide studies

References

Notes

Citations

Wikipedia outlines
Genocide